The Battle of Talisay in Batangas province, Philippines, was fought during the Philippine Revolution on October 12, 1896, that led to Filipino victory.

Background 
The Filipinos, by the time the revolution began, Batangas was already a hotspot for revolutionary activities, and as a consequent result it was one of the first provinces that declared independence from Spain and joined the Katipunan. The Spanish then conducted offensives against Filipino rebel encampments in the province but failed.

Battle 
General Emilio Aguinaldo was already winning battles in Cavite province, and had begun amassing huge throngs of men willing to join the Katipunan. Then he went along with a huge force to Batangas to join with generals Miguel Malvar and Candido Tirona and to amass more men in the province to join the revolution. The Spanish fought hard, but one entire company of theirs was completely destroyed. As a result, the revolutionaries overran the Spanish positions stationed at Talisay then continued to join with the revolutionary army of General Aguinaldo, which he left in Cavite while being assigned to Katipunero generals including Santiago Alvarez to continue the revolution there, after the victory.

Aftermath 
To follow up victory, General Malvar then launched a simultaneous attack in the towns of Lemery, Bayungyungan, Calaca, and Taal in the same province, but after suffering heavy losses, called off the attacks. However, the effect of the battle also prevented the afterwards severely weakened Spanish units in the province to help quell the ongoing revolution in Cavite.

References 

About Batangas
Miguel Malvar

Battles of the Philippine Revolution
History of Batangas